Rahman (Arabic:  or ) may refer to:

Rahman, one of the names of God in Islam
Ar-Rahman, the 55th sura of the Qur'an

People
Rahman (name), an Arabic male personal name
Short form of Abd al-Rahman
Rahman (actor) (born 1967), Indian actor
Rahman (Bengali actor) (born 1937)
A. R. Rahman (born 1967), Indian music composer and singer

Places
Rahman, Casimcea, Tulcea, Romania
Rahmanabad-e Zagheh-ye Lalvand, or Rahman, Lorestan Province, Iran
Deh-e Rahman, or Rahman, Sistan and Baluchestan Province, Iran

See also
 Al rahman (disambiguation)
 Rehman (disambiguation)
 Raman (disambiguation)
 Ramen (disambiguation)
 Rachman
 Rahma (disambiguation)

Names of God in Islam